Norman S. Edelcup/Sunny Isles Beach K–8 is part of the Miami-Dade County School District. It educates students from kindergarten through eighth grade from Sunny Isles Beach, Eastern Shores, and Golden Beach. 

The school opened in 2008. It was initially discussed as a means to relieve class sizes in Ruth K. Broad Bay Harbor Elementary School, Ojus Elementary School, and Highland Oaks Middle School.

Change of name
The school opened in August 2008, under the name Sunny Island Community School. The name change was first proposed in February 2011. It was the first school established in Sunny Isles Beach.

Architecture
The building was designed by SBLM Architects.

Hours
Students of the school attend during the following hours;
 Kindergarten – first grade: 8:20 am–1:50 pm.
 Second – eighth grade: 8:35 am–3:05 pm and 8:35 am–1:50 pm on Wednesdays.

References

External links

 Norman S. Edelcup/Sunny Isles Beach K-8

Public K–8 schools in Florida
Miami-Dade County Public Schools schools
Elementary schools in Miami-Dade County, Florida
Middle schools in Miami-Dade County, Florida